Lou Eula May Caballero Simo-Samson (born May 23, 1995), known professionally as Eula Caballero, is a Filipino former actress. She is known as the first Star Factor grand winner. She also played the role of Holly Posadas in the TV mini-series, Nandito Ako on TV5. Caballero landed a major project wherein she again portrayed the daughter of a veteran actress, ranged against the Diamond star Maricel Soriano. Eula played as the daughter of Maricel Soriano and Gabby Concepcion in the Metro Manila Film Festival (MMFF) entry Yesterday, Today, Tomorrow.

Early life
Eula was born in Boljoon, Cebu to Mary Lou Caballero-Simo and Euladio Simo. She is now married with her co-finalist of Star Factor Christian Samson on October 10, 2017, in Los Angeles, California, U.S.A.

Background
In 2010, she joined the celebrity talent search of TV5, Star Factor. She was one of the 18 star hopefuls and after few weeks of training, made it to the top 4 or "Final 4". In the Grand Finals held at the Ynares Sports Arena, she was declared the winner of the talent search.

Filmography

Film

Television

Music video

Awards

References

External links
 
 
 

1995 births
TV5 (Philippine TV network) personalities
Living people
Participants in Philippine reality television series
Actresses from Cebu
University of San Carlos alumni